Fighter Squadron 124 or VF-124 was an aviation unit of the United States Navy. Originally established as Reserve Squadron VF-874 it was called to active duty on 20 July 1950, redesignated VF-124 on 4 February 1953, it was disestablished on 10 April 1958.

Operational history

During this deployment VF-874 lost 11 aircraft and 2 pilots.

VF-124 was assigned to Carrier Air Group 12 (CVG-12) aboard  during the Far Eastern cruise from 10 August 1955 to 15 March 1956.

Home port assignments

Aircraft assignment
F4U-4 Corsair
F7U-3 Cutlass

See also
History of the United States Navy
List of inactive United States Navy aircraft squadrons
List of United States Navy aircraft squadrons

References

External links

Strike fighter squadrons of the United States Navy